Raymond Bwanga Tshimen (born 4 January 1949 in Élisabethville, Belgian Congo) is a former footballer from the Democratic Republic of the Congo. Bwanga won the 1973 African Footballer of the Year while with TP Mazembe in Lubumbashi. During his playing days in the early and mid 1970s he was nicknamed "Black Beckenbauer" by the African and French press due to his playing style.

Bwanga was voted the IFFHS Player of the Century for the Democratic Republic of the Congo in 2000. In 2006, he was selected by CAF as one of the best 200 African football players of the last 50 years.

He is the cousin of fellow footballer Kazadi Mwamba.

References

External links

1949 births
Living people
People from Lubumbashi
Democratic Republic of the Congo footballers
Association football defenders
Democratic Republic of the Congo international footballers
Africa Cup of Nations-winning players
1974 FIFA World Cup players
1972 African Cup of Nations players
1974 African Cup of Nations players
1976 African Cup of Nations players
TP Mazembe players
African Footballer of the Year winners
21st-century Democratic Republic of the Congo people